The  is the official pharmacopoeia of Japan. The first edition was published on 25 June 1886, with revisions being issued from time to time. The current revision is number 18, issued electronically on 7 June 2021. An official English translation is in preparation (status: 06 Aug 2021).

See also 
 The International Pharmacopoeia

References 

Pharmacopoeias
Pharmacy in Japan

ja:薬局方#日本薬局方